This is a list of members of the South Australian Legislative Council from 1881 to 1885.

This was the seventh and last Legislative Council to be elected under the Constitution of 1856, which provided for a house consisting of eighteen members to be elected from the whole colony acting as one electoral district "The Province"; that six members, selected by lot, should be replaced at General Elections after four years, another six to be replaced four years later and thenceforth each member should have a term of twelve years.

Six seats were declared vacant by rotation in 1881: Ayers, Fisher, Hay, Milne, Santo and Tarlton;

A significant feature of this election was the "ticket" recommending Rankine, Pickering, Tarlton, Hay, Ayers and Spence, issued by the South Australian Farmers' Mutual Association for members and other farmers to follow.

Ayers and Tarlton were re-elected; the other vacancies were filled by Buik, Pickering, Rankine and Spence.

A supplementary state-wide election was held on 29 May 1882 to prepare for the forthcoming reorganization of the Council, and six additional members were needed. Those elected were David Murray, Salom, English, Hay, Glyde and Cotton.

References
Parliament of South Australia — Statistical Record of the Legislature

Members of South Australian parliaments by term
19th-century Australian politicians